Death Patrol may refer to:

Death Patrol, George Low story from Commando (comics) 
Death Patrol, squad from DC Comics imprint Military Comics 1943 Gill Fox  
Death Patrol, 1959 episode of Mackenzie's Raiders with  Iron Eyes Cody
Death Patrol, associated band of Foreign Legion (band)
"Death Patrol", song by Ariel Pink from Dedicated to Bobby Jameson